Conor McKerr (born 19 January 1998) is an English-South African cricketer who plays county cricket in England for Surrey County Cricket Club. McKerr holds a British passport. He made his first-class debut on loan to Derbyshire in 2017.

Career
Conor McKerr was born in Johannesburg, Gauteng, on 19 January 1998. He was a member of the South Africa under-19 squad for the 2016 Under-19 Cricket World Cup in Bangladesh. He left South Africa to sign for Surrey in March 2016, with the intention of qualifying to play for England. On 31 May 2017, he joined Derbyshire on a one-month loan from Surrey. He made his first-class debut for Derbyshire in the 2017 County Championship on 2 June 2017, taking four wickets in the match against Nottinghamshire. On his second Championship appearance for Derbyshire, against Northamptonshire, McKerr finished with bowling figures of 5/87 and 5/54, becoming the youngest bowler to take ten wickets in a match for the county. This proved to be his final appearance for Derbyshire, as he was recalled by Surrey on 12 June.

He made his List A debut on 23 April 2019, for Surrey in the 2019 Royal London One-Day Cup. He made his Twenty20 debut on 15 June 2021, for Derbyshire in the 2021 T20 Blast. In 2022 he played two matches on loan at Kent at the end of the season.

References

External links
 

1998 births
Living people
South African cricketers
Surrey cricketers
Derbyshire cricketers
Kent cricketers
Cricketers from Johannesburg
South African emigrants to the United Kingdom
English cricketers